Eftim is a given name. Notable people with the name include:

People
Religion
Turkish Orthodox Patriarchs of the Autocephalous Turkish Orthodox Patriarchate:
Papa Eftim I
Papa Eftim II
Papa Eftim III
Papa Eftim IV

Others
Eftim Aksentiev (born 1985), Macedonian footballer
Eftim Angelov known as Timo Angelov, Bulgarian revolutionary
Eftim Bogoev (born 1980), Macedonian basketball player 
Eftim Gerzilov (born 1952), Bulgarian rower